Prodromos Kathiniotis is a Greek singer and reality-TV celebrity distinguished as a spontaneous, straightforward, manly and folksy personality. His fame is largely attributed to the Greek version of  Big Brother. His first album,  "The first game" has elements of traditional Greek music. He appeared as a panel member in a daily TV show called  H Ellada Paizei ("Greece Plays" - Alter Channel) hosted by Marietta Chrousala.

References

21st-century Greek male singers
Living people
Year of birth missing (living people)